James McNew is an American musician. He has been the bass player for the rock band Yo La Tengo since their 1992 album, May I Sing with Me.

He was previously a member of the band Christmas, being featured on their third album Vortex.

He also has a solo side project, Dump.

The documentary The Parking Lot Movie highlighted McNew's career as a parking lot attendant in Charlottesville, Virginia, prior to his career as a musician.

References

External links

1996 interview by Theresa Stern
Splendid ezine interview by Mike Baker
The Parking Lot Movie

Living people
American rock bass guitarists
American male bass guitarists
Musicians from Charlottesville, Virginia
Yo La Tengo members
American male guitarists
Lambchop (band) members
1969 births